Steffen Fäth (born 4 April 1990) is a German handball player for Rhein-Neckar Löwen and the German national team.

He participated at the 2019 World Men's Handball Championship.

Achievements
Summer Olympics:
: 2016
European Championship:
: 2016

References

External links

1990 births
Living people
German male handball players
Sportspeople from Frankfurt
HSG Wetzlar players
Rhein-Neckar Löwen players
VfL Gummersbach players
Handball-Bundesliga players
Füchse Berlin Reinickendorf HBC players